Sarati the Terrible (French:Sarati, le terrible) is a 1923 French silent film directed by René Hervil and Louis Mercanton and starring Henri Baudin, André Feramus and Ginette Maddie. In 1937 it was remade as a sound film.

Cast
 Henri Baudin as Sarati  
 André Feramus as Gilbert de Kéradec  
 Ginette Maddie as Rose  
 Arlette Marchal as Hélène  
 Pâquerette as Remedios

References

Bibliography
 Rège, Philippe. Encyclopedia of French Film Directors, Volume 1. Scarecrow Press, 2009.

External links

1923 films
Films directed by Louis Mercanton
Films directed by René Hervil
French silent films
French black-and-white films
1920s French films